Charanjit Singh Atwal (born 15 March 1937) is an Indian politician who was Deputy Speaker of the 14th Lok Sabha of India from 2004 to 2009. He represented the Phillaur constituency of Punjab in the 14th Lok Sabha and is a member of the Shiromani Akali Dal (SAD) political party.

He was Speaker of the Punjab Legislative Assembly from 1997 to 2002 and again from 2012 to 2017.

Early life
Charanjit Singh Atwal was born to a Sikh family in Montgomery, Punjab Province, British India (Punjab in Pakistan after partition in 1947). Sardar Atwal's family, like many Punjabis migrated to Indian Punjab as refugees when they found themselves living on the wrong side of the border. He graduated from GGN Khalsa College, Ludhiana and then obtained his LLB degree from Panjab University, Chandigarh.

Political life
Sardar Charanjit Singh Atwal was a member of the Lok Sabha from 1985 to 1989. He was then Speaker of the Punjab Assembly from 1997 to 2002. He is a respected member of the Indian Parliament for 20 years and has over 40 years of service in politics. He has been in the field of politics since 1957 and was elected to the Punjab State Assembly in 1977. He is considered among the top hierarchy of the Shiromani Akali Dal. In the 2001 election Sardar Atwal stood in the Phillaur constituency and crushed his political rival Santosh Chowdhury of the Indian National Congress by a huge margin of 98,884 votes. Santosh Chowdhury was the previous 1999 election winner, winning by what was then a large margin of 26,573 votes.

From 1997 to 2000 he was Chairman of the Committee on Welfare of Scheduled Castes, Scheduled Tribes and Backward Classes. He was jailed during the 1975-77 emergency.

He has served as Speaker of Punjab Legislative Assembly for a second time since 2012.

Personal life

Sardar Charanjit.S.Atwal is married to Inderjit Kaur, with whom he has two sons, Inder Iqbal Singh Atwal (also a politician & businessman) and Jasjeet Singh Atwal and three daughters, Dr. Kulminderjit Kaur, Parminderjit Kaur and Tripat Kaur Atwal.Inder Iqbal Singh Atwal has one son who is the eldest Azeez Atwal. Jasjeet Atwal has a pair of twins.

References

External links
 Members of Fourteenth Lok Sabha - Parliament of India website

Living people
1937 births
India MPs 2004–2009
People from Jalandhar
Politicians from Ludhiana
Deputy Speakers of the Lok Sabha
Shiromani Akali Dal politicians
India MPs 1984–1989
Punjab, India MLAs 1997–2002
Speakers of the Punjab Legislative Assembly
Members of the Punjab Legislative Assembly
Lok Sabha members from Punjab, India
Indians imprisoned during the Emergency (India)